WeTransfer is an internet-based computer file transfer service company that was founded in 2009, based in Amsterdam, Netherlands.

History
WeTransfer was founded in 2009 by Rinke Visser, Bas Beerens and Ronald Hans (Nalden) in Amsterdam, Netherlands. It was created to enable the sharing of large files (up to 2GB) for free.

In 2012, WeTransfer implemented a re-design and introduced a 'Plus' service with support for much larger file transfers (up to 5GB) and storage (50GB) as well as send files to a maximum of 100 recipients for a price.

In 2013, WeTransfer reached profitability.

In 2014, WeTransfer launched "creative-class.tv", an ongoing video series. The company initiated its first bursaries that year through a collaborative partnership with Central Saint Martins. These bursaries supported two students from around the globe in their full-time studies.

In 2015, WeTransfer raised a US$25 million Series A funding round from Highland Capital Partners Europe. They also added venture capitalist Troy Carter to its board.

WeTransfer file transfer limit is 200GB for PRO Subscribers as of September 2021

2016 – present 
In 2016, WeTransfer announced the acquisition of digital design studio Present Plus, established in 2010 by Damian Bradfield and WeTransfer co-founder Nalden.  In September, WeTransfer opened its first office in the United States at Venice Beach, Los Angeles.

In early 2017, Gordon Willoughby became the company's Chief Executive Officer, taking over from Bas Beerens who became Executive Chairman.

In January 2018, WeTransfer launched content arm "WePresent". In August, WeTransfer acquired app developer FiftyThree, whose portfolio included sketching app Paper and collaborative presentation app Paste. In October, WeTransfer relaunched its mobile app with the name "Collect by WeTransfer".

In June 2019, WeTransfer experienced a security incident in which files were "sent to the wrong people". In August, the company closed a €35 million secondary funding round led by HPE Growth.

In May 2020, India banned the WeTransfer app, citing security reasons. In June, the company became a certified B Corporation.

In February 2021, WeTransfer achieved carbon-neutral certification having pledged the previous year to reduce emissions by 30% by 2025. In March, the 2020 short film "The Long Goodbye" by Aneil Karia and Riz Ahmed commissioned by WeTransfer through WePresent won the 2022 Academy Award for Best Live Action Short Film. In April, the WeTransfer Foundation, "Supporting Act", focused on helping emerging creative talent was launched and the company pledged to donate 1% of revenues from 2022 onwards. In October, WeTransfer announced sales in 2020 of €65m.

In April 2021, Reuters reported that the WeTransfer logos and likeness were used in high-profile phishing scams.

In January 2022, WeTransfer planned for an IPO but ended up cancelling the offering shortly before listing.

In 2022, Alexandar Vassilev took over from Gordon Willoughby as the company's Chief Executive Officer.

Leadership 
Bas Beerens founded the file-sharing platform WeTransfer with Nalden (Ronald Hans) and Rinke Visser in 2009. Beerens also runs the design consultancy OY Communications (initially OY Transfer) from which WeTransfer was developed. In 2012, he founded WeMarket, a global B2B marketplace for buyers and suppliers in any industry.

Damian Bradfield, co-founder, joined the company in 2010. Bradfield is currently WeTransfer's Chief Creative Officer.

Chief Executive Gordon Willoughby joined WeTransfer in January 2017. He announced his departure from the company in May 2022 and was replaced by former Chief Technology Officer Alexandar Vassilev.

Chief Financial Officer Melissa Nussbaum joined WeTransfer from King in September 2020.

Martha Lane Fox joined WeTransfer as chair in July 2020.

Technology 
WeTransfer is based on Amazon's infrastructure and technology. It uses Amazon S3 for storage and for sending files.

Services 
WeTransfer offers a free service where users can send up to two gigabytes of data and a paid option called WeTransfer Pro where users can send up to 200 gigabytes of data as well as have some additional customization options.

Revenue model
WeTransfer has a dual revenue model split between advertising and premium ("pro") subscriptions.
 
WeTransfer displays full-screen advertisements while transferring instead of banner ads. The company donates 30% of the advertising inventory to creatives and charitable causes.

See also 
 Comparison of file hosting services

References 

Dutch companies established in 2009
Cloud storage
Companies based in Amsterdam
Internet properties established in 2009
Internet technology companies of the Netherlands
File hosting
File sharing services